Carved into Stone is the eighth studio album by American metal band Prong. It reached No. 13 at the Top Heatseekers chart. Released on April 24, 2012, via Long Branch Records/SPV, the work was produced by Steve Evetts with cover artwork by Vance Kelly.

Reception 

Carved into Stone received positive reviews from critics. On Metacritic, the album holds a score of 84/100 based on four reviews.

Track listing 
All lyrics by Tommy Victor, except "Ammunition" by Franky DeSmet-VanDamme, Mikey Doling and Victor; "Revenge...Best Served Cold" by Mike Longworth and Tommy Victor; and "Feuer frei!" by Rammstein.

 "Eternal Heat" (Tommy Victor, Tony Campos, Alexei Rodriguez)
 "Keep On Living in Pain" (Victor, Campos, Rodrigues)
 "Ammunition" (Phil Baheux, Tino De Martino, Franky DeSmet-VanDamme, Mikey Doling, Victor)
 "Revenge...Best Served Cold" (Mike Longworth, Victor)
 "State of Rebellion" (Victor, Campos, Rodrigues)
 "Put Myself to Sleep" (Victor, Campos, Rodrigues)
 "List of Grievances" (Victor, Campos, Rodrigues)
 "Carved into Stone" (Victor, Campos, Rodrigues)
 "Subtract" (Victor, Campos, Rodrigues)
 "Path of Least Resistance" (Victor, Campos, Rodrigues)
 "Reinvestigate" (Victor, Campos, Rodrigues)
 "Feuer frei!" (Rammstein cover; bonus track)

Personnel 
Tommy Victor – vocals, guitars
Tony Campos – bass, backing vocals
Alexei Rodriguez – drums

Chart performance

References 

2012 albums
Prong (band) albums